The 2012–13 season was the 114th season of competitive league football in the history of English football club Wolverhampton Wanderers. The club competed in the second tier of the English football system, the Football League Championship. They had returned to the second level having been relegated from the Premier League after three seasons during the previous season.

Norwegian manager Ståle Solbakken was appointed to begin the season as the club's manager, but he was sacked on 5 January with the team in 18th place and having been eliminated from the FA Cup by at that time non-league club Luton Town. He was swiftly replaced by former Doncaster Rovers manager Dean Saunders who oversaw the remaining twenty games.

After Saunders failed to bring any upturn, the club suffered relegation for a second successive season to drop into the third level for the first time since 1988–89. This made them the only club to twice experience back-to-back relegations from the top flight, having already suffered this previously in the mid 1980s. Three days after their relegation was confirmed, Saunders was fired having held the post for only four months.

Season review

Having been relegated from the Premier League after three seasons, the club sought to put a new playing style in place under new manager Ståle Solbakken who officially became the permanent replacement for Mick McCarthy on 1 July. In contrast to McCarthy's preference for British and Irish players, the Norwegian used the foreign market for all of his summer signings, with Bakary Sako, Razak Boukari, Björn Sigurðarson and Georg Margreitter signing permanent deals as well as the loan captures of Tongo Doumbia and Sławomir Peszko. Despite these incomings, the transfer window saw the sale of several key players with leading goalscorer Steven Fletcher exiting for a club record £14 million fee, and both Matt Jarvis and Michael Kightly also remaining in the Premier League with new clubs.

The players began pre-season training on 9 July, which featured a week at a training camp in Ireland. After four pre-season matches, their first competitive game of the campaign saw the team narrowly win a League Cup tie against Aldershot after a penalty shootout. League football began on 18 August with a 0–1 defeat at Leeds, before the team registered their first victory at Molineux in nine months by beating Barnsley.

After an inconsistent start September brought a run of four consecutive victories to lift the team up the table. Victory at fellow newly relegated club Blackburn in early October placed Wolves in third place, which was to be their highest position of the season. These results came at a price as their injury list grew with Razak Boukari, Stephen Hunt and Sławomir Peszko all sidelined with long-term problems. Winger Jermaine Pennant was therefore loaned to help but the team hit a poor run of form and failed to win any of their next ten fixtures.

December began with a halting of this poor sequence as three wins were recorded from four games, but their three games over the festive period were all lost, leading Solbakken to declare that they were "in a crisis". When the following game - a loss at Luton - brought their first exit from the FA Cup to a non-league side since 1986, he was fired as manager after six months in the role. He later expressed disappointment at owner Steve Morgan offering him such a limited period of time to oversee a reshaping of the club's playing culture and identity.

In contrast to the club's "drawn-out" recruitment process after the dismissal of Mick McCarthy, Solbakken's replacement was swiftly announced within two days as former Doncaster Rovers' manager Dean Saunders was unveiled on 7 January as Wolves' fourth different manager within twelve months. Steve Morgan defended the changes and stated that he hoped Saunders would be with the club "for a long period of time".

At the time of Saunders' first game at the helm, the team sat in 18th position six points clear of the relegation zone and nine points from the play-off places. He said that, while he believed promotion still remained possible, "the more likely scenario is we’re going to creep up the league." He soon used the January transfer window to make two loan signings as defenders Kaspars Gorkšs and Jack Robinson were brought in from the top flight. The manager's first game brought a 1–1 draw against Blackburn, which was to be the first of nine winless games under his command.

Saunders' first win arrived at the start of March, by which time the team had slumped into the Championship relegation zone for the first time since October 1999. An upturn in form brought four wins from five games but the form of the other relegation-battling sides meant that Wolves were never any more than a single point above the relegation zone. Injuries to both of their leading goalscorers, Sylvan Ebanks-Blake and Bakary Sako, further endangered their risk of losing their Championship status.

Shorn of attacking options, their final six games brought five defeats which meant relegation for a second consecutive season. A home loss to Burnley in their penultimate match effectively consigned the club to their fate, and led to some supporters storming the pitch at full-time to show their anger at the situation. Only victory on the final day, coupled with defeats for both Barnsley and Peterborough and a five-goal swing in goal difference would have prevented relegation, but in the event, Wolves lost their game at Brighton to become the first club to twice be relegated from the top division to the third level within two years.

Although Saunders initially spoke of his hopes to be allowed to rebuild the team in League One, three days later it was announced that he had become the fourth Wolves manager in fifteen months to leave his post. The club announced it would be taking an indefinite time to seek a "head coach" rather than a manager as it sought to restructure in preparation for their first season outside the top two divisions since 1988–89.

Results

Pre season
The final pre-season friendly was scheduled to be held on 11 August against Aston Villa, but was cancelled to allow Wolves to instead take up the option of playing their League Cup tie on this date.

"Wolves Development XI" pre season results: 0–2 vs Leyton Orient (25 July), 0–1 vs Kidderminster Harriers (27 July), 4–2 vs Birmingham (1 August), 2–0 vs Telford United (3 August), 3–1 vs Wigan (8 August)

Football League Championship

A total of 24 teams competed in the Football League Championship in the 2012–13 season. Each team played every other team twice, once at their stadium, and once at the opposition's. Three points were awarded to teams for each win, one point per draw, and none for defeats.

The provisional fixture list was released on 18 June 2012, but was subject to change in the event of matches being selected for television coverage or police concerns.

Final table

Results summary

Results by round

FA Cup

League Cup

Players

Statistics

|-
|align="left"|||align="left"|||align="left"| 
|0||0||0||0||0||0||0||0||0||0||
|-
|align="left"|||align="left"|||align="left"|  ¤
|||0||0||0||1||0||||0||0||0||
|-
|align="left"|||align="left"|||align="left"| 
|||2||0||0||1||0||||2||1||0||
|-
|align="left"|||align="left"|||align="left"|  ¤
|||1||0||0||3||0||||1||1||0|||
|-
|align="left"|||align="left"|||align="left"| 
|0||0||0||0||0||0||0||0||0||0||
|-
|align="left"|||align="left"|||align="left"|  †
|0||0||0||0||0||0||0||0||0||0||
|-
|align="left"|||align="left"|||style="background:#faecc8; text-align:left;"|  ‡
|||0||||0||||0||style="background:#98FB98"|||0||3||0||
|-
|align="left"|||align="left"|||align="left"|  (c)
|||0||1||0||1||0||||0||8||1|||
|-
|align="left"|||align="left"|FW||align="left"| 
|||14||1||0||1||1||||15||6||0|||
|-
|align="left"|10||align="left"|FW||align="left"|  †
|0||0||0||0||0||0||0||0||0||0||
|-
|align="left"|10||align="left"|||align="left"| 
|||9||1||0||||1||style="background:#98FB98"|||10||3||0||
|-
|align="left"|11||align="left"|||align="left"| 
|||2||1||0||1||0||||2||2||1|||
|-
|align="left"|12||align="left"|||align="left"| 
|||1||0||0||||0||||1||1||0||
|-
|align="left"|13||align="left"|||align="left"| 
|38||0||1||0||2||0||41||0||0||0|||
|-
|align="left"|14||align="left"|||align="left"| 
|42||2||1||0||1||0||44||2||7||1|||
|-
|align="left"|15||align="left"|FW||align="left"| 
|||5||0||0||2||0||style="background:#98FB98"|||5||2||0||
|-
|align="left"|16||align="left"|||align="left"| 
|30||0||1||0||||0||||0||1||1||
|-
|align="left"|17||align="left"|||align="left"|  †
|||0||0||0||0||0||||0||0||0||
|-
|align="left"|17||align="left"|||align="left"| 
|||0||0||0||2||0||style="background:#98FB98"|||0||2||0||
|-
|align="left"|18||align="left"|FW||align="left"|  †
|||0||0||0||||1||style="background:#98FB98"|||1||0||0||
|-
|align="left"|18||align="left"|||align="left"| 
|0||0||0||0||0||0||0||0||0||0||
|-
|align="left"|19||align="left"|||align="left"|  ¤
|||0||0||0||0||0||||0||0||0||
|-
|align="left"|20||align="left"|||align="left"|  †
|0||0||0||0||0||0||0||0||0||0||
|-
|align="left"|20||align="left"|||style="background:#faecc8; text-align:left;"|  ‡
|||0||0||0||0||0||style="background:#98FB98"|||0||2||0||
|-
|align="left"|20||align="left"|||style="background:#faecc8; text-align:left;"|  ‡
|11||0||0||0||0||0||style="background:#98FB98"|11||0||1||0||
|-
|align="left"|21||align="left"|||align="left"|  †
|0||0||0||0||0||0||0||0||0||0||
|-
|align="left"|21||align="left"|||style="background:#faecc8; text-align:left;"|  ‡
|15||0||0||0||0||0||style="background:#98FB98"|15||0||2||0||
|-
|align="left"|22||align="left"|||align="left"|  ¤
|||0||0||0||1||0||||0||1||0||
|-
|align="left"|23||align="left"|||align="left"|  †
|||0||0||0||2||0||||0||0||0|||
|-
|align="left"|23||align="left"||| style="background:#faecc8; text-align:left;"|  ‡
|||1||0||0||0||0||style="background:#98FB98"|||1||1||0||
|-
|align="left"|24||align="left"|||align="left"|  
|||0||1||0||0||0||||0||5||1|||
|-
|align="left"|25||align="left"|||align="left"| 
|||1||0||0||2||1||||2||0||0||
|-
|align="left"|26||align="left"|||align="left"| 
|||0||||0||3||0||||0||4||0|||
|-
|align="left"|27||align="left"|||align="left"|  ¤
|||0||1||0||||0||||0||0||0|||
|-
|align="left"|28||align="left"||| style="background:#faecc8; text-align:left;"|  ‡
|||2||0||0||||0||style="background:#98FB98"|||2||2||0|||
|-
|align="left"|29||align="left"|FW||align="left"| 
|||9||1||0||1||0||||9||2||0|||
|-
|align="left"|30||align="left"|||align="left"|  ¤
|13||1||0||0||0||0||13||1||5||0||
|-
|align="left"|31||align="left"|||align="left"| 
|||0||0||0||1||0||||0||0||0||
|-
|align="left"|32||align="left"|||align="left"| 
|||0||1||0||0||0||||0||1||0||
|-
|align="left"|33||align="left"|||align="left"|  ¤
|0||0||0||0||0||0||0||0||0||0||
|-
|align="left"|34||align="left"|||align="left"| 
|||0||0||0||2||0||style="background:#98FB98"|||0||0||0||
|-
|align="left"|35||align="left"|FW||align="left"|  ¤
|||0||||0||0||0||style="background:#98FB98"|||0||0||0||
|-
|align="left"|36||align="left"|||align="left"|  ¤
|0||0||0||0||0||0||0||0||0||0||
|-
|align="left"|37||align="left"|FW||align="left"|  ¤
|0||0||0||0||0||0||0||0||0||0||
|-
|align="left"|39||align="left"|||align="left"| 
|0||0||0||0||0||0||0||0||0||0||
|-
|align="left"|41||align="left"|||align="left"| 
|0||0||0||0||0||0||0||0||0||0||
|-
|align="left"|42||align="left"|||align="left"| 
|0||0||0||0||0||0||0||0||0||0||
|-
|align="left"|43||align="left"|||align="left"| 
|0||0||0||0||0||0||0||0||0||0||
|-
|align="left"|44||align="left"|||align="left"| 
|0||0||0||0||0||0||0||0||0||0||
|-
|align="left"|45||align="left"|||align="left"| 
|0||0||0||0||0||0||0||0||0||0||
|-
|align="left"|46||align="left"|||align="left"| 
|0||0||0||0||0||0||0||0||0||0||
|-
|align="left"|47||align="left"|||align="left"|  ¤
|0||0||0||0||||0||style="background:#98FB98"|||0||0||0||
|-
|align="left"|48||align="left"|FW||align="left"| 
|0||0||0||0||0||0||0||0||0||0||
|-
|align="left"|49||align="left"|FW||align="left"| 
|||0||0||0||0||0||style="background:#98FB98"|||0||0||0||
|-
|align="left"|50||align="left"|||align="left"| 
|0||0||0||0||0||0||0||0||0||0||
|}

Awards

Transfers

In

Out

Loans in

Loans out

Management and coaching staff

Kit
The season brought both new home and away kits manufactured, for the final year of their contract, by BURRDA. The new home kit featured the club's traditional gold and black colours, with the shirt having a gold collar. The away kit was a teal kit, reviving the colours used in their 1996–97 change strip. Both shirts featured the internet gambling company Sportingbet.com as sponsor for the final time.

References

2012–13 Football League Championship by team
2012-13